Zhang Jiehui (born January 1957) is a former Chinese politician who served as a Vice Chairman of the Hebei People's Congress. He was dismissed from his position in December 2017 for investigation by the Central Commission for Discipline Inspection.

Career
Zhang Jiehui was born in January 1957, and he was entered to Shenyang Chemical Technology Institute in 1978. In 1982, he entered to work at Liaoyang Petrochemical Company, then he was appointed as the deputy county chief of Dengta County in 1986. Later he was named as the Director of Industrial Economics Branch of the Planning Commission of Liaoning Province and Deputy Director of Petrochemical Industry Department.

In 1998, Zhang was appointed as the Deputy Mayor of Panjin, then he moved to the CPC Liaoning Committee, and became the Policy Research Director. He was appointed as the Mayor of Anshan in 2000, and promoted to the party chief in 2005.

In 2010, Zhang was appointed as the Vice Governor of Hebei, then he was appointed as the Deputy Director of Hebei People's Congress in 2017.

Investigation
On December 12, 2017, Zhang Jiehui was placed under investigation by the Central Commission for Discipline Inspection, the party's internal disciplinary body, for "serious violations of regulations". He was expelled from the Communist Party and dismissed from public office on February 9, 2018. 

On July 29, he has been indicted on suspicion of accepting bribes. On October 18, Taiyuan Intermediate People's Court heard Zhang's case. He was accused of taking advantage of his different positions in Liaoning and Hebei between 2001 and 2017 to seek profits for various companies and individuals in business development, obtaining bank loans and enterprise acquisition, as well as project land approval and job promotions, in return for bribes paid in cash or gifts worth more than 126 million yuan ($18.2 million).

On July 10, 2020, he was sentenced to 15 years in prison for taking bribes and also had 6 million yuan (about 858,000 U.S. dollars) worth of personal assets confiscated.

References

1957 births
Chinese Communist Party politicians from Liaoning
People's Republic of China politicians from Liaoning
Political office-holders in Liaoning
Political office-holders in Hebei
Living people
Politicians from Dandong
Northeastern University (China) alumni
Expelled members of the Chinese Communist Party